This is a list of television programs that have been broadcast by Toon Disney (now Disney XD) in the United States. The channel was launched on April 18, 1998, as a spinoff of Disney Channel, and aired mostly syndicated animated programming, ranging from action to comedy.

The first program broadcast on Toon Disney was the Mickey Mouse segment from Fantasia titled "The Sorcerer's Apprentice". It was followed by a sampling of other Mickey Mouse shorts and episodes of Timon and Pumbaa, The New Adventures of Winnie the Pooh,  Goof Troop, TaleSpin, and Aladdin.

The list does not include the programs that were introduced as Jetix, a block on Toon Disney that ran from 2004 to 2009.

Former programming
 1 Also aired on ABC Kids from ABC.
 2 Also aired on Disney's One Too from UPN.
 3 Integrated into the Disney XD initial lineup.

Original programming

Syndicated from Disney Channel

Syndicated from The Disney Afternoon

Syndicated from ABC & UPN

Syndicated from CBS

Syndicated from DIC Entertainment

Other programming
{| class="wikitable sortable"
|+
!Title
!Premiere date
!End date
!Original network
!Source(s)
|-
|Wild West C.O.W.-Boys of Moo Mesa
|April 19, 1998
|March 31, 2001
|ABC
|
|-
|Blazing Dragons
|August 31, 1998
| rowspan="2" |August 31, 2002
|Teletoon
|
|-
|The Care Bears Family
| rowspan="2" |September 1, 1998
|ABC
|
|-
|Hello Kitty and Friends
|June 29, 2002
|YTV
|
|-
|Rupert
|September 4, 2001
|August 30, 2002
|YTVNickelodeon
|
|-
|Toad Patrol
|September 1, 2002
|September 6, 2004
|Teletoon
|
|-
|Spaced Out
|October 4, 2002
|September 17, 2003
|France 3, Canal+
|(US Broadcast only) (The series was broadcast on  Cartoon Network in Europe)
|-
|Garfield and Friends|September 2, 2003
|January 29, 2006
|CBS
|
|-
|Ultimate Book of Spells|September 3, 2002
|August 23, 2003
|YTV
|
|-
|What's with Andy?|January 18, 2005
|June 2, 2005
|TeletoonFox Family
|
|-
|All Dogs Go to Heaven: The Series|September 2, 2006
|October 16, 2006
|Broadcast syndicationFox Family Channel
|
|-
|Minuscule|August 26, 2007
|February 10, 2009
|Original (French production by Futurikon)
|
|-
|Shaun the Sheep|November 27, 2007
|July 6, 2008
|CBBCDisney Channel
|
|}

 Short programming 

 Interstitial programming 
 Story Time (premiered April 19, 1998)
 Mike's Super Short Show Disney’s Really Short Report Great Minds Think 4 Themselves Gadgetoonery Toon Tunes The Mix-Ups Disney's Magic Drawing Squash and Stretch Toonology Find Out Why? Toon Treats Captain O.G. Readmore For Better or For Worse Jirimpimbira: An African Folk Tale The Bollo Caper Ralph S. Mouse Birthday Dragon Bad Cat Meet the Raisins Programming blocks 
 Magical World of Toons (1998–2003)
 Toons in the House (2000–2001)
 Princess Power Hour (2000–2007)
 @Toon (2001–2004)
 Scary Saturdays (2001–2005)
 Scary Toon Afternoon (2001)
 Sunday Monster Mania (2001)
 Monster of the Month (2001)
 Monster Mania Marathon (2001)
 November Movies (2004)
 December Movies (2004)
 January Movies (2005)
 Hangin' with the Heroes (2001-2004)
 Jingle Toons (1998–2001)
 Month of Merriment (2002–2005)
 12 Days of Christmas (2006–2008)
 Movie Madness (2003–2004)
 Jetix (2004–2009)
 Play Again Jam-It (2006-2007)
 Mega Jam (2007)
 Mega Movie Jam (2007)
 Toon Disney Treasure Cove (2007–2008)
 2oon Disney (2001–2004)
 Friday Night Movie (1998–2001)
 Double Feature Movie Night (2001–2005)
 Big Movie Show (2004–2009)
 Big Movie Weekend (2007–2009)
 Summer Movie Splash (2005)
 Summer Movie Splash 2 (2005)
 Summer Movie Splash 3 (2005)
 Splish Splash Movie Bash (2006)
 Summer 1000 Prizes (2007–2008)
 Wild Wild Quest Movies Week Wild Wild Quest Movies Week 2 Wild Wild Quest Movies Week 3''

See also 
 List of programs broadcast by Jetix
 List of programs broadcast by Jetix (block)
 List of programs broadcast by Disney XD

References

External links 
  - includes the Launch program for Toon Disney which has the first week's programming guide

Toon Disney original programming
Disney XD original programming
Toon Disney
Disney Channel related-lists